James Herbert (1943–2013), was an English fiction writer.

James Herbert may also refer to:

Politicians
 James Herbert (died 1677) (c. 1623–1677), English politician who sat in the House of Commons variously between 1645 and 1677
 James Herbert (died 1709) (c. 1644–1709), MP for Monmouth Boroughs
 James Herbert (1660–1704), English politician

Others
 James Herbert (cricketer) (1895–1957), Australian cricketer
 James Herbert (director) (born 1938), American painter and film director
 Jimmy Herbert (1897–1968), Canadian professional ice hockey player
 James D. Herbert (art historian) (born 1959), professor and chair of the art history department at the University of California Irvine
 James D. Herbert (psychologist) (born 1962), psychologist, professor, and university administrator

See also